An Insignificant Harvey is a 2011 independent Canadian drama film. The film made its world premiere at the Busan International Film Festival in South Korea. The feature-length directorial debut by Canadian director Jeff Kopas, the film profiles the life of Harvey Lippe, a janitor at a small town ski resort, who also happens to be a little person, who has his life dramatically change when he finds a stray husky and falls for an exotic dancer.

The film stars Jordan Prentice as Harvey, Kristin Adams as Dakota, and Steven McCarthy as Lucas.

Cast
 Jordan Prentice as Harvey Lippé
 Kristin Adams as Dakota Dixon
 Steven McCarthy as Lucas Harold
 Art Hindle as Father Asher
 Inca Kopas as Inca
 Philip Williams as Paul Lalone
 Eli Ham as Jason Lalone
 Lee Rumohr as Adam Kane

References

External links 

2011 films
Canadian drama films
English-language Canadian films
2011 drama films
2010s Canadian films